Munenobu (written: 宗宣 or 宗信) is a masculine Japanese given name. Notable people with the name include:

 (1259–1312), Japanese noble
 (1515–1560), Japanese samurai

Japanese masculine given names